This is a list of lists of universities and colleges by country, sorted by continent and region. The lists represent educational institutions throughout the world which provide higher education in tertiary, quaternary, and post-secondary education.

By continent

Africa
Algeria
Angola
Benin
Botswana
Burkina Faso
Burundi
Cameroon
Cape Verde
Central African Republic
Chad
Comoros
Congo
Democratic Republic of the Congo
Djibouti
Egypt
Eritrea
Ethiopia
Equatorial Guinea
Eswatini
Gabon
The Gambia
Ghana
Guinea
Guinea-Bissau
Ivory Coast
Kenya
Lesotho
Liberia
Libya
Madagascar
Malawi
Mali
Mauritania
Mauritius
Morocco
Mozambique
Namibia
Niger
Nigeria
Rwanda
Senegal
Seychelles
Sierra Leone
Somalia
Somaliland
South Sudan
Sudan
South Africa
Tanzania
Togo
Tunisia
Uganda
Zambia
Zimbabwe

Asia
Afghanistan
Bahrain
Bangladesh
Bhutan
Brunei
Cambodia
China (mainland)
East Timor
Hong Kong
India
Indonesia
Iran
Iraq
Israel
Japan
Jordan
Kazakhstan
Kuwait
Kyrgyzstan
Laos
Lebanon
Malaysia
Macau
Mongolia
Myanmar
Nepal
North Korea
Oman
Pakistan
Palestine
Philippines
Qatar
Saudi Arabia
Singapore
South Korea
Sri Lanka
Syria
Taiwan
Tajikistan
Thailand
Turkmenistan
United Arab Emirates
Uzbekistan
Vietnam
Yemen

Europe
Albania
Andorra
Armenia
Austria
Azerbaijan
Belarus
Belgium
Bosnia and Herzegovina
Bulgaria
Croatia
Cyprus
Czech Republic
Denmark
Estonia
Finland
France
Georgia
Germany
Gibraltar
Greece
Greenland
Hungary
Iceland
Ireland
Italy
Kosovo
Latvia
Liechtenstein
Lithuania
Luxembourg
Malta
Moldova
Monaco
Montenegro
Netherlands
Northern Cyprus
North Macedonia
Norway
Poland
Portugal
Romania
Russia
San Marino
Serbia
Slovakia
Slovenia
Spain
Sweden
Switzerland
Turkey
Ukraine
United Kingdom: Universities; Colleges offering HE courses
England
Northern Ireland
Scotland
Wales
Vatican City

North America

Caribbean
Antigua and Barbuda
Barbados
Cayman Islands
Cuba
Dominica
Dominican Republic
Haiti
Jamaica
Saint Vincent and the Grenadines
Trinidad and Tobago

Central America
Belize
Costa Rica
El Salvador
Guatemala
Honduras
Mexico
Nicaragua
Panama

Northern America
Canada
United States

Oceania
Australia
Cook Islands
Fiji
French Polynesia
New Zealand
Nauru
Niue
Papua New Guinea
Samoa
Solomon Islands
Tokelau
Tonga
Tuvalu
Vanuatu
Wallis and Futuna

South America
 Argentina
 Bolivia
 Brazil
 Chile
 Colombia
 Ecuador
 Guyana
 Paraguay
 Peru
 Suriname
 Uruguay
 Venezuela

International
List of international schools

See also
 List of education articles by country
 List of for-profit universities and colleges
 List of largest universities and university networks by enrollment
 Lists of universities and colleges

External links
 World Universities and Colleges
 University Directory Worldwide
 International college database